Buell is a masculine given name which may refer to:

 Buell F. Jones (1892–1947), American attorney and 11th attorney general of South Dakota
 Buell Kazee (1900–1976), American country and folk singer
 Buell Neidlinger (1936–2018), American cellist and double bassist
 Buell A. Nesbett (1910–1993), American soldier, lawyer, businessman and first chief justice of the Alaska Supreme Court
 Buell Quain (1912–1939), American ethnologist

English-language masculine given names